"Future Starts Now" is the first single by German singer-songwriter Kim Petras from her scrapped third studio album Problématique. It was released on 27 August 2021 through Amigo and Republic Records, making it her debut single under a major label.

Background 
The song was first teased on Twitter by Petras, who said her album is "fully done" and the single would be released in the coming weeks. A performance of the upcoming single was played during her set at the 2021 Lollapalooza on 29 July 2021. After the performance, a small preview was released on Petras' own website with a link to pre-save the song on Spotify. On 16 August, an official announcement of the release date was posted on her social medias, showing Petras surrounded by baguettes with a short clip of the song playing in the background.

In the beginning of August 2022, Petras confirmed that the album, titled Problématique, is scrapped and approved listening to the leaked material from it.

Charts

References 

2021 singles
2021 songs
Kim Petras songs
Songs written by Kim Petras
Songs written by Dr. Luke
Song recordings produced by Dr. Luke
Republic Records singles